The 2018 season was FC Ukraine United's third season in the Canadian Soccer League, and twelve season since their founding in the Ontario Soccer League. The season marked United's return to the First Division after participating in the Second Division the previous year. After a competitive season with FC Vorkuta the club won their first division title on September 23, 2018.In the postseason United won their preliminary match against Brantford Galaxy, but were defeated in the second round to Scarborough SC. Pavlo Lukyanets, a veteran striker from Ukraine was United's top goalscorer with twelve goals.

Summary  
After spending the 2017 season in the Second Division with a perfect season the club was promoted back into the First Division.Andrei Malychenkov resumed his coaching duties, and maintained the majority of his previous roster with additional imports from the Ukraine. From the onset of the season the club remained highly competitive, and battled with rivals FC Vorkuta for supremacy of the division. Throughout the season Malychenkov achieved the necessary results in clinching the First Division title, and managed an undefeated streak of ten matches with the best offensive record. In the opening round of the playoff tournament FC Ukraine faced Brantford Galaxy, and defeated Brantford 8-7 in a penalty shootout. Their postseason campaign came to a conclusion in the second round after a 2-1 defeat to Scarborough SC.

Team

Roster

Management

Canadian Soccer League

First Division

Results summary

Results by round

Matches

Postseason

Statistics

Goals 
Correct as of September 30, 2018

References 

FC Ukraine United
FC Ukraine United
FC Ukraine United
FC Ukraine United